Phoremia is a genus of insect in family Gryllidae.

Taxonomy
The Orthoptera Species File database lists the following species:
Phoremia circumcincta (Mesa, Ribas & García-Novo, 1999
Phoremia nigrofasciata Mesa, Ribas & García-Novo, 1999
Phoremia rolfsi (Pereira, Sperber & Lhano, 2011
Phoremia tabulina Desutter-Grandcolas, 1993
Phoremia zefai Pereira, Sperber & Lhano, 2011

References

Ground crickets